Oliver Bryant (born 8 May 1995) is an English rugby union player who plays at fly half for CR El Salvador in Spain's top level of rugby union the División de Honor de Rugby.  He has previously played for Leicester Tigers, Doncaster Knights and Jersey Reds in England.

Career

On 1 November 2014 Bryant made his Leicester debut away to London Irish in the Anglo-Welsh Cup.  Later that season Bryant was called in the England U-20s squad. On 19 February 2016 Bryant made his Premiership debut against Harlequins scoring 9 points and impressing in a 25-19 loss.

On 17 May 2017 it was announced that Bryant was to leave Welford Road and sign for Jersey in the RFU Championship from the 2017-18 season.

On 26 July 2018 it was announced that Bryant was to leave Jersey and sign for CR El Salvador in the Spanish División de Honor de Rugby from the 2018-19 season.

References

1995 births
Living people
Doncaster Knights players
English rugby union players
Jersey Reds players
Leicester Tigers players
Rugby union fly-halves
Rugby union players from Truro